The 2013–14 season of the Serie A1 was the 29th season of top-tier futsal in Italy, which began October 5, 2013 and finished on April 18, 2014. At the end of the regular season the top eight teams played in the championship playoffs. The bottom two clubs played in a two-leg playoff to see who was relegated to Serie A2.

League table

Relegation playoff

1st leg

2nd leg

Napoli won 16–1 on aggregate and Napoli will remain in Serie A1 for the 2014-2015 season. Marca is relegated to Serie A2.

Championship playoffs

Calendar

Bracket

Top scorers

References

External links 
 Divisione calcio a 5

Serie A (futsal) seasons
Italy
Futsal